Uteyka (Ütäy) is a rural locality (a village) in Maxim-Gorkovsky Selsoviet, Belebeyevsky District, Bashkortostan, Russia. The population was 86 as of 2010. There are 2 streets.

Geography 
Uteyka is located 26 km southeast of Belebey (the district's administrative centre) by road. Sarmandeyevka is the nearest rural locality.

References 

Rural localities in Belebeyevsky District